Jihae Kim (born 1989), better known by the mononym Jihae, is a South Korean singer and actress living in the United States. She debuted as a singer in 2007 and has since released four full-length albums. As an actress, she has appeared in the miniseries Mars (2016), the film Mortal Engines (2018) the Netflix series Altered Carbon, and the HBO series Succession.

Early life and education
Jihae was born in Seoul, South Korea. As the daughter of a diplomat, she grew up in Nigeria and Sweden. She attended Emory University, where she graduated with a degree in political science.

Career
Jihae began her career as a model, appearing in ads for the women's clothing brand Eileen Fisher.

In 2007, she released her first album, My Heart Is an Elephant. A video for the album featured filmmaker Michel Gondry playing percussion using kitchenware and musician Lenny Kravitz playing the guitar and bass. Jihae released her second album, Elvis is Still Alive, in 2008.

In 2009, Jihae launched her own music label and multimedia company, Septem.

In 2010, Jihae co-created a rock opera, Fire Burning Rain, with Academy Award-winning playwright/director John Patrick Shanley, based on her concept album of the same name. She released her fourth album, Illusion of You, in 2015. She co-produced the album with Dave Stewart of Eurythmics, as well as Stuart Matthewman and Jean-Luc Sinclair. The album includes a song cowritten by Leonard Cohen.

Jihae had her first major acting role in 2015, when she played twin sisters Joon and Hana Seung in the National Geographic miniseries Mars. In 2018, she played Anna Fang in the film Mortal Engines.

Activism
In 2012, Jihae and Dave Stewart recorded the song, "Man to Man, Woman to Woman," which was chosen by then-Secretary of State Hillary Clinton as the theme song for the 2012 Hours Against Hate campaign to combat bigotry. Jihae and Stewart performed the song at a concert in London on July 24.

Discography

Studio albums

 My Heart Is an Elephant (2007)
 Elvis Is Still Alive (2008)
 Fire Burning Rain (2010)
 Illusion of You (2018)

Digital albums 

 Fire Burning Rain
 My Heart Is An Elephant 
 Elvis Is Still Alive
 Illusion Of You
 Afterthough

Filmography

Film

Television

References

External links
 
 

Year of birth missing (living people)
Living people
21st-century American actresses
21st-century American women singers
21st-century American singers
21st-century South Korean actresses
21st-century South Korean women singers
American actresses of Korean descent
American singers of Asian descent
American film actresses
American television actresses
American women rock singers
American women record producers
American women singer-songwriters
South Korean film actresses
South Korean television actresses
South Korean rock singers
South Korean women record producers
South Korean women singer-songwriters
Singers from Seoul
Actresses from Seoul
South Korean emigrants to the United States
Emory University alumni
1989 births